The 7.65mm Roth–Sauer is a centerfire cartridge resembling a shortened .32 ACP.  Two self-loading pocket pistols were designed for this cartridge. One was manufactured by Roth-Sauer of Germany, and the other by Frommer of Hungary.

The Roth-Sauer pistol was named for its Austrian patentee Georg Roth, but was developed by Czech designer . It was produced in small quantities (probably less than 3000) by J P Sauer & Sohn of Suhl in Germany during the early 1900s. It employed a notably complex long-recoil mechanism to fire a unique 7.65 x 13mm cartridge. It bears similarities to other designs by Krnka, the most famous of which was Roth-Steyr adopted for service by the Austro-Hungarian Army. The striker firing mechanism is also of interest, in that it foreshadows the system used in modern double-action striker-fired pistols such as the Glock.

The markings on some of the surviving pistols suggest that they were used by the Berlin police and also Landes polizei for the German colony of South West Africa.

External links

References

Pistol and rifle cartridges